Neli Sabeva (born ) is a Bulgarian female wheelchair curler.

Teams

References

External links 

Living people
1961 births
Bulgarian female curlers
Bulgarian wheelchair curlers